Theerangal is a 1978 Indian Malayalam film, directed by Rajeevnath. The film stars Jayabharathi, KPAC Lalitha, M. G. Soman and Nellikode Bhaskaran in the lead roles. The film has musical score by P. K. Sivadas and V. K. Sasidharan.

Cast
Jayabharathi 
KPAC Lalitha 
M. G. Soman 
Nellikode Bhaskaran 
Vincent

Soundtrack
The music was composed by P. K. Sivadas and V. K. Sasidharan and the lyrics were written by Ettumanoor Somadasan.

References

External links
 

1978 films
1970s Malayalam-language films